Chao Yung may refer to:

Chinese cruiser Chaoyong
Zhao Yong (disambiguation)